Griedge Yinda Colette Mbock Bathy Nka (born 26 February 1995) is a French professional footballer who plays as a centre-back for Division 1 Féminine club Lyon and the France national team.

Career
Mbock Bathy was born in Brest, Brittany to a family of Cameroonian and Maĺagasy descent. A strong centre-back, she joined Stade Briochin in 2010 who merged with En Avant de Guingamp in 2011. After four seasons under Guingamp, she moved to the current French champions Lyon on a four-year deal.

With the French under-17 team, Mbock Bathy played in the 2012 FIFA U-17 Women's World Cup in Azerbaijan. She was named FIFA's Player of the Tournament after France won a penalty shootout in the final over North Korea, marking the occasion with a memorable dance routine.

At the 2013 UEFA Women's Under-19 Championship, Mbock Bathy was suspended for the final after being sent off in the semi-final. In the final France beat England 2–0 after extra time.

In November 2013 she made her senior France debut in a 10–0 win over Bulgaria.

Personal life
Mbock's brother, Hiang'a Mbock, is also a professional footballer.

Career statistics

International

Scores and results list France's goal tally first, score column indicates score after each Mbock Bathy goal.

Honours
Lyon
Division 1 Féminine: 2015–16, 2016–17, 2017-18, 2018-19,2019–20
Coupe/Challenge de France: 2015–16, 2016–17, 2018–19,2019–20
UEFA Women's Champions League: 2015–16, 2016–17 2017-18, 2018-19, 2019–20
 Trophée des Championnes: 2019

France
SheBelieves Cup: 2017

France U17
FIFA U-17 Women's World Cup: 2012

Individual
 FIFA U-17 Women's World Cup Golden Ball winner: 2012
 UNFP Division 1 Féminine Young Player of the Year: 2015–16

References

External links
 
 
 
 

1995 births
Living people
French women's footballers
France women's youth international footballers
France women's international footballers
Sportspeople from Brest, France
French sportspeople of Cameroonian descent
Women's association football central defenders
2015 FIFA Women's World Cup players
Olympique Lyonnais Féminin players
Footballers at the 2016 Summer Olympics
Olympic footballers of France
Division 1 Féminine players
En Avant Guingamp (women) players
Black French sportspeople
Footballers from Brittany
2019 FIFA Women's World Cup players
UEFA Women's Euro 2022 players
UEFA Women's Euro 2017 players